Ntare VI (January 10, 1940 – October 14, 2011) was the Omugabe of Nkore or Ankole and the 27th of the Bahinda dynasty, although he did not rule over Ankole.

Ntare VI was born as John Patrick Barigye in January 1940 to Omugabe (King) Charles Godfrey Gasyonga II of Ankole /Nkore kingdom, Uganda and Queen Constance Ndyomwishiki. Barigye graduated in economics from Cambridge University in England in 1962 and has subsequently been ambassador in West Germany and the Vatican. Idi Amin, then president of Uganda, gave Barigye a job as an ambassador after Barigye and Barigye's father publicly asked Amin not to restore the monarchy.

He died in October 2011 at the age of 71 and wS succeeded by his son current titular King Charles Rwebishengye  The late Prince John Barigye is survived by two wives and nine children.  He had separated from his first wife with whom he had five children [four daughters and one son. His second wife, Queen mother Denise Kwezi is the mother of the remaining four children, all sons. The children(in no particular order) are Omugabe Charles Rwebishengye, Prince Clive Mutambuka Barigye, Prince Alex Kahaya Barigye, Prince Fred Wamara Barigye, Prince Siima Barigye, Princess Keza Korwizi Barigye Ryan, Princess Olivia Kagaaga Barigye, Princess Toyah Magwende Barigye and Princess Nunu Nzhunaki Yvonne Barigye.

Coronation and kingship

His coronation took place on November 20, 1993 and was subsequently nullified by the NRM government. He was the first king after the kingship had been abolished 1967. The kingship in Ankole is still not restored, contrary to the other kingdoms in Uganda viz Toro, Buganda and Bunyoro. President Museveni himself nullified the coronation in 1993, saying the people of Ankole had to decide.

References

1940 births
2011 deaths
Ankole
Ugandan monarchies